Adolf Rieger (25 August 1899 – 12 June 1956) was a German wrestler who competed in the 1928 Summer Olympics.

References

External links
 

1899 births
1956 deaths
Olympic wrestlers of Germany
Wrestlers at the 1928 Summer Olympics
German male sport wrestlers
Olympic silver medalists for Germany
Olympic medalists in wrestling
Medalists at the 1928 Summer Olympics
19th-century German people
20th-century German people